"Mi tengo" / "Me quedo" (I keep) is a song recorded by Italian singer Laura Pausini for her studio album Inedito. The song, produced by Paolo Carta, was written by Laura Pausini and Niccolò Agliardi, with the music being composed by Niccolò Agliardi, Matteo Bassi and Simone Bertolotti.

The song was also recorded in a Spanish-language version, titled "Me quedo", but was not released as a single from the Spanish-language version of the album, Inédito.

The song shows a very mature sense of love, a way to understand how many times the end of a story is the most correct path to take. The separation, while it hurts, leaves in the mind the signs of a past happiness. There are stories that end up without guilt or guilty, but only because it necessarily takes a different route.

Release
In March 2012, Pausini confirmed that the song "Inedito" would not be released as a single due to Gianna Nannini, with whom Pausini shares the vocals, being on vacation and not promoting the song while on tour. Then Pausini asked which song would be the fourth single, with the options being "Troppo tempo" and "Le cose che non mi aspetto". The song was released on March 23, 2012.

Videoclip

Much alike the previous videoclips from "Inedito", "Mi tengo" was directed by the same Gaetano Morbioli and recorded in March 2012.

The video takes place on a simple white background with Laura Pausini accompanied by the dancers, evocating images of the song. All of the people present on the clip are shown with their torso and back naked, including Pausini herself. In the end of the chorus, alluding to the song's lyrics, Pausini is shown with a paper flower on her hands.

It was presented for the first time on March 18, 2012 at the Nelson Mandela Forum in Firenze, during the Inedito World Tour.

The videoclip was directed by Pausini's backing vocalist and artistic collaborator Gianluigi Fazio.

Track list
Digital Download:
Mi tengo
Me quedo

Credits
Laura Pausini: voice, songwriter
Celso Valli: piano, keyboards
Simone Bertolotti: keyboards
Samuele Dessì: electric guitar, guitar, computer programming
Cesare Chiodo: bass
Emiliano Bassi: drums, percussion
Paolo Valli: drums
Tommy Ruggero: percussion
 C.V. Ensemble Orchestra: conductor

Laura Pausini songs
Atlantic Records singles
Italian-language songs
Spanish-language songs
2012 singles
Songs written by Laura Pausini
Songs written by Niccolò Agliardi
2011 songs